Nicolas Rigault (Rigaltius; 1577-1654) was a French classical scholar.

Born at Paris, he was educated by the Jesuits. He was successively councillor of the parlement of Metz, procurator general at Nancy, and intendant of the province of Toul.

He prepared annotated editions of Phaedrus, Martial, Juvenal, Tertullian, Minucius Felix, Saint Cyprian, and also some mixed collections: Rei accipitrariæ scriptores, 1612; Rei agrariae scriptores, 1613.

He acted as librarian to Louis XIII. He used a pseudonym J. B. Aeduus.

Selected works
 1596
 — «Asini aurei asinus, sive De scaturigine onocrenes» (1596; экземпляр парижской национальной библиотеки считается uniсum), 
 — «Satyra Menippea somnium», 
 1600 — «Biberii Curculionis parasiti mortualia, accessit Asinus...» (более известная под заглавием III изд.: "Funus parasiticum" (П., 1601), "Rei agrariae scriptores" (1613)).

Sources
Nicolas Rigault, in Marie-Nicolas Bouillet et Alexis Chassang (eds), Dictionnaire universel d'histoire et de géographie, 1878

Notes

1577 births
1654 deaths
Writers from Paris
French classical scholars